The 2020–21 NBB season was the 13th season of the Novo Basquete Brasil (NBB), the highest level basketball league in Brazil.

Team changes

Regular season 

Source: NBB

Playoffs

Statistics

Individual statistical leaders 
Leaders after the regular season.

References 

Novo Basquete Brasil seasons
2021–22 in basketball leagues